Amirabad (also Romanized as Amīrābād; also known as Amīrābād-e Gūdarzī) is a village in Gudarzi Rural District, Oshtorinan District, Borujerd County, Lorestan Province, Iran. At the 2006 census, its population was 157, in 43 families.

References 

Towns and villages in Borujerd County